Arthur Power Lord (October 22, 1868 – January 15, 1960) was an American golfer. He competed in the men's individual event at the 1900 Summer Olympics.

References

External links
 

1868 births
1960 deaths
Amateur golfers
American male golfers
Olympic golfers of the United States
Golfers at the 1900 Summer Olympics
Sportspeople from New York City
American emigrants to France
Golfers from New York (state)